Giacomo Salomoni (1231 – 31 May 1314) was an Italian Roman Catholic priest and a professed member from the Order of Preachers. He was a noted ascetic known for being prone to ecstatic states on a frequent basis; he served as a prior of several convents until he settled in Forlì where he remained until his death.

Salomoni's beatification was approved in mid-1526.

Life
Giacomo Salomoni was born in 1231 in the Republic of Venice to the noble Salamon family, one of the oldest patrician houses of Venice; his mother raised him after his father died though his mother later became a Cistercian nun at which stage his maternal grandmother raised him.

He became a Dominican in 1248 and became the prior of houses at several places such as Faenza and San Severino as well as Ravenna. But Forlì was where he settled for the remainder of his life. He gained fame for healing as well as for his prophetic abilities obtained through an ecstatic state. From 1269 he lived at a Dominican convent in Forlì and was called the "father of the poor". He also earned fame for being the person who received the confession of Carino of Balsamo - the murderer of Peter of Verona - and became his spiritual director.

Salomoni suffered from cancer but he was cured some time before his death in 1314. He was serving in the choir when he suffered a sudden heart attack and died. Salomoni's remains were conserved in an urn at Forlì but in 1939 were translated to Venice to the basilica of Santi Giovanni e Paolo in a chapel.

Beatification
In 1315 a brotherhood was founded to promote veneration for Salomoni.  On 26 June 1526 he received formal beatification from Pope Clement VII upon the confirmation of his cult for Forlì. But it was not until 1568 that Pope Pius V approved that veneration for Venice; Pope Gregory XV approved his cult for the Dominicans in 1622.

A shrine was built to Salomoni at the Saint Catherine of Siena church that the Dominicans manage in Manhattan.

The oldest indult which Pope Benedict XIV quotes in this connection is that which Clement VII granted to the Dominicans of the convent of Forlì on 25 January 1526 to celebrate the Mass for the late Salomoni "as often during the year as their devotion may move them to do so" (Benedict XIV, De canonizatione de SS.).

References

External links
 Santi e Beati 

1231 births
1314 deaths
13th-century venerated Christians
13th-century Venetian people
13th-century Italian Roman Catholic priests
14th-century venerated Christians
14th-century Venetian people
14th-century Italian Roman Catholic priests
Italian beatified people
Italian Dominicans
Republic of Venice clergy
Prophets
Venerated Catholics